Energy in Mexico describes energy and electricity production, consumption and import in Mexico.

In 2008, Mexico produced 234 TWh of electricity, of which, 86 TWh was from thermal plants, 39 TWh from hydropower, 18 TWh from coal, 9.8 TWh from nuclear power, 7 TWh from geothermal power and 0.255 TWh from wind power. Mexico is among the world's top oil producers and exporters.

Overview

Oil production

Renewable energy

Geothermal power 
Mexico had the sixth greatest geothermal energy production in 2019. Mexico is home to the largest geothermal power stations in the world, the Cerro Prieto Geothermal Power Station.

Wind power

Related industry

Carbon capture and storage

Government regulation

Secretariat

See also 

 List of power stations in Mexico

References

External links 

 Secretaría de Energía (SENER) – Mexican government information